Banksia Peninsula is a peninsula in Victoria.

A long, narrow, sandy peninsula, it is the site of Duck Arm, a popular recreational bay with around thirty houses and a number of school camps.

The name refers to the plant genus Banksia, which grows in the area.

References

 

 

Peninsulas of Victoria (Australia)